Defilers and Preservers: The Wizards of Athas is an accessory for the 2nd edition of the Advanced Dungeons & Dragons fantasy role-playing game.

Contents
Defilers and Preservers: The Wizards of Athas includes a comprehensive listing of every spell available to the wizards of Athas, drawn from the second edition Player's Handbook, The Complete Wizard's Handbook, the original Tome of Magic, and the revised edition rules from the Dark Sun Campaign Setting, Expanded and Revised. It also includes details on new magical sources to draw from and expanded guidelines on the actual drain of magical energy. Many tables and charts are reproduced from "The Age of Heroes" booklet, but these are combined with the new procedures to create a complete magical tome to refer to. The book includes 13 new character kits for the wizard class, including the shadow wizards who draw from a new source of energy - a realm of chill darkness known only as The Black. Full rules are detailed for the transformation of 20th level wizards to 21st level dragons, or avangions for good-aligned characters, both of which also have psionic powers. Defilers and Preservers also adds 13 new proficiencies and 61 new spells, as well as 10th level reality-altering psionic enchantments.

Publication history
Defilers and Preservers: The Wizards of Athas was published by TSR in 1996 as a 96-page book.  It was designed by Nicky Rea, and featured cover illustrations by Maren, and interior illustrations by John T. Snyder.

Reception
David Comford reviewed Defilers and Preservers: The Wizards of Athas for Arcane magazine, rating it a 9 out of 10 overall. According to Comford, Defilers and Preservers offers defiler and preserver characters the chance to have power like that of the sorcerer kings as they slowly and surely transform into beasts like the Dragon. While the book expands on much material from previous books "to create a complete magical tome to refer to, instead of the constant scrabbling between countless books that normally results in an AD&D game", he feels that the new material is the "real value of the book". He felt that the new character kits "greatly expands the gaming potential for magic users". He felt that the artwork is "mostly of a good, sketch-like quality and complements the text, which has a well-indexed layout and is easily followed". Comford concluded that "Defilers and Preservers is essential for anyone planning to run or play wizards in the Dark Sun setting. The new and expanded rules and details are not just merely useful, but flesh out the lives, abilities and skills of the arcane scholars."

References

Dark Sun supplements
Role-playing game supplements introduced in 1996